The KKT Cup Vantelin Ladies Open is an annual tournament on the LPGA of Japan Tour. It was first held in 1972 at the Tamana Country Club in Kumamoto Prefecture.

Winners 
KKT Cup Vantelin Ladies Open
2022 Nozomi Uetake
2021 Miyū Yamashita
2020 Cancelled
2019 Lee Ji-hee
2018 Mamiko Higa
2017 Yukari Nishiyama
2016 Cancelled due to earthquake
2015 Erika Kikuchi
2014 Minami Katsu (amateur)
2013 Miki Saiki

Nishijin Ladies Classic
2012 Maiko Wakabayashi
2011 Yuri Fudoh
2010 Inbee Park

Life Card Ladies
2009 Ji-Hee Lee
2008 Yukari Baba
2007 Momoko Ueda
2006 Yuri Fudoh
2005 Sakura Yokomine

Saishunkan Ladies Hinokuni Open
2004 Yuri Fudoh
2003 Ji-Hee Lee
2002 
2001 Kaori Higo
2000 Midori Yoneyama
1999 Hirao Minamikuko
1998 Michiko Hattori
1997 Senkayo Yamazaki
1996  
1995 Nayoko Yoshikawa
1994 Shioya Ikuyo
1993 Fuki Kido
1992 Shioya Ikuyo

References

LPGA of Japan Tour events
Golf tournaments in Japan
Recurring sporting events established in 1972
1972 establishments in Japan